JSC Krasny Gidropress is a company based in Taganrog, Russia and established in 1907. It is currently part of Tactical Missiles Corporation.

The Taganrog Krasnyy Gidropress Plant, formerly a major supplier of propellers and other shipboard equipment to the Soviet Navy, is expanding production of household appliances.

References

External links
 Official website

Manufacturing companies of Russia
Companies based in Rostov Oblast
Tactical Missiles Corporation
Ministry of the Shipbuilding Industry (Soviet Union)
Manufacturing companies of the Soviet Union
Defence companies of the Soviet Union
Companies nationalised by the Soviet Union